Red Action was a British leftist political group formed in 1981. It became known for violently confronting groups such as the British National Party on the streets, and for being the main organisational force behind Anti-Fascist Action. In 1995, The Independent estimated that it had between 20 and 30 branches with 10–15 activists in each, and the paper stated that the group "enthusiastically espouses the use of violence"; it also set out links between Red Action and the Irish republican movement, and stated that members operated primarily in large cities such as London, Manchester, Leeds and Glasgow.

The group was formed by activists who had been expelled from the Socialist Workers Party (SWP) for their involvement in alleged "squadism" (violent actions against far right racist groups). The expelled activists regrouped around a paper named Red Action. After several years, the group became more interested in the electoral process, and it joined the Red Front electoral alliance in 1987 and the Socialist Alliance in England and Wales in 1999. Red Action members then left this organisation, along with the Socialist Party, citing the domination of the SWP over the organisation. Some Red Action members went on to found the Independent Working Class Association.

References

Further reading
Mark Hayes "Red Action - left-wing pariah: some observations regarding ideological apostasy and the discourse of proletarian resistance" in Evan Smith and Matthew Worley, eds, Against the grain: The British far left from 1956, Manchester University Press 2014
Stott, Paul "For every action there is an equal and opposite reaction: two responses on the British left to the rise of identity politics – the cases of Class War and Red Action" Twentieth Century Communism, Volume 9, Number 9, August 2016, pp. 96–120(25) Publisher: Lawrence and Wishart; DOI: https://doi.org/10.3898/175864316815923542

External links
Red Action archive
"Left Wing Political Pariah": history of Red Action by Mark Hayes
Red Action material at Libcom
As Soon As This Pub Closes - Red Action section satirical profile by John Sullivan

Anti-fascist organisations in the United Kingdom
Anti-racist organisations in the United Kingdom
Political parties established in 1981
1981 establishments in the United Kingdom